Phaulacridium vittatum, the Wingless Grasshopper, is a species of short-horned grasshopper in the family Acrididae. It is found in Australia.

References

External links

 

Acrididae